Bowling took place for the men's and women's individual, doubles, trios, and team events at the 1998 Asian Games in  P.S. Bowl of the Mall Shopping Center Bangkapi, Bangkok, Thailand from December 9 to December 14.

Medalists

Men

Women

Medal table

References

Medalists

External links
Results

 
1998 Asian Games events
1998
Asian Games